Kasongo Airport   is an airport serving the town of Kasongo in Maniema Province, Democratic Republic of the Congo.

Some sources have the two airports conflated.

See also

 Transport in the Democratic Republic of the Congo
 List of airports in the Democratic Republic of the Congo

References

External links
 OpenStreetMap - Kasongo
 OurAirports - Kasongo
 FallingRain - Kasongo
 HERE Maps - Kasongo

Airports in Maniema